"Don't Leave Me" is a song by American R&B group Blackstreet, produced by Teddy Riley and released in February 1997 as the third single from their second album, Another Level (1996). It contains a sample of the DeBarge song "A Dream", also used in "I Ain't Mad at Cha" by Tupac Shakur. "Don't Leave Me" features Eric Williams, Mark Middleton, and Chauncey Hannibal on lead vocals. It topped the New Zealand Singles Chart for two weeks in May 1997 and reached  6 in the United Kingdom. In the United States, the song peaked at No. 12 on the Billboard Hot 100 Airplay chart.

Critical reception
Pan-European magazine Music & Media noted that after the success of "No Diggity", "Riley & Co. switch to ballad mode with this well constructed song, which has already met with approval across Europe." Stephan Hampe, head of music at RSH, a CHR network covering northern Germany commented, "I think this is going to break Blackstreet in a big way in Germany, because it is the kind of great song that really stands out". He added, "while No Diggity received a warm welcome too, it remained largely confined to the quarters traditionally inhabited by the R&B fraternity over here. This record however, has the potential to appeal to a much broader audience, so we put in powerplay rotation (32 plays a week) because we want to familiarize our audience quickly with this song."

David Finlan from Experience said that the song "is slightly depressing, because it is about a man trying to keep his girlfriend from breaking up with him. This song hits home because everybody has been through a breakup and as we all know, they are not fun." Malaysian newspaper New Straits Times noted "the fantastic four-part harmony interplay" on "Don't Leave Me". A reviewer from People Magazine stated that Blackstreet "pours on the heartache and late-night yearning". David Fricke from Rolling Stone felt "the turn-ons" in songs like "Don't Leave Me", "are as banal as the titles suggest." James L. Brown from USC Today described it as "a slow bump and grind ballad".

Chart performance
The song did not chart on the US Billboard Hot 100 or the Hot R&B Singles chart due to Billboard rules at the time preventing songs not released as physical singles from charting. However, the song peaked on the Hot 100 Airplay and Hot R&B Airplay charts at No. 12 and No. 1, respectively. Internationally, it went to No. 1 in New Zealand and No. 6 in the United Kingdom.  In the former country, it stayed at No. 1 for two weeks in May 1997 and earned a Gold sales certification from Recorded Music NZ, finishing the year as the 12th-most-successful single.

Music video

The official music video for the song was directed by Michael Martin.

Track listings

Charts

Weekly charts

Year-end charts

Certifications

Release history

References

1990s ballads
1996 songs
1997 singles
Blackstreet songs
Contemporary R&B ballads
Interscope Records singles
Number-one singles in New Zealand
Song recordings produced by Teddy Riley
Songs written by Bink (record producer)
Songs written by Teddy Riley
Soul ballads